Devarachikkanahalli, abbreviated as DC Halli, is a village in South Bangalore.
It is a small locality which is located near Bannerghatta Road, little away from Bilekahalli. This village connects Bannerghatta Road with Begur.

The present MLA of Devarachikkanahlli is Sathish Reddy  and the pin code of Devarachikkanahlli is 560076.

Transport
The village is well connected by the Bangalore Metropolitan Transport Corporation.
Route 366A connects Devarachikkanahalli with KR MARKET.
Route 364B connects Devarachikkanahalli with Kempegowda Bus Station/Majestic.
Route 368F connects Devarachikkanahalli with Shivajinagar

Location
Devarachikkanahalli located near Bannerghatta road. Devarachikkanahalli comes under Ward 175.

References 

Neighbourhoods in Bangalore